Božidar Petranović (18 February 1809 – 12 September 1874) was a Serbian author, scholar, journalist, and one of the leading historians of Serbian literature and a distinctive proponent of world literature. He is also mentioned as Theodor (Greek version of Serbian Božidar) Petranović in some publications. He is regarded as one of the early Serbian bibliographers.

Biography

Born in Šibenik, Dalmatia, Božidar Petranović was one of the first Dalmatian Serbs to be educated in the newly constructed Metropolitanate of Karlovci's Gymnasium of Karlovci. He was also educated in Graz together with Ljudevit Gaj.

Božidar Petranović was the founder and publisher of the first Serb academic and scientific paper in Zadar, entitled the "Serbian-Dalmatian Magazine". In 1838, Petranović claimed that the greater part of the population of the Kingdom of Dalmatia was "of Serb name" and spoke "true Serbian dialect". He later hired the Dubrovnik Eastern Orthodox priest Georgije Nikolajević as an editor of Magazin, and the two promulgated Ljudevit Gaj-Vuk Karadžić's language reforms. He also corresponded with authors Niccolò Tommaseo, Francesco Dall'Ongaro, journalist Pacifico Valussi (1813-1893), Ivan August Kaznačić (1817–1883), Medo Pucić, and Stipan Ivičević (1801–1871).

Throughout 1848-1849, Petranović argued that to secure a better economic future it was necessary to transfer Dalmatia into a commercial haven between sea and hinterland, between the Mediterranean and Balkan trade by lifting maritime custom taxes. In this pursuit, Petranović, along with Stipan Ivičević and Zora dalmatinska editor Ante Kuzmanić, tried to found a Dalmatian-Bosnian newspaper. Ivičević also sought to convince Habsburg authorities to set up a railroad line that connected Dalmatia directly to Mostar, Sarajevo, and Belgrade.

Also, in 1838, he claimed Dubrovnik's literary tradition for Serbia since Dubrovnik's (also known as Ragusa of old) authors "wrote in Serbian, but with Latin letters." (Croats particularly members of the Catholic clergy were of the opposite opinion and so the dispute continues to this day).
Similar theories were proposed by Vaso Glušac (1879–1955) at the beginning of the 20th century, and contemporary historian Dragoljub Dragojlović in his 1987 book.

Ljubomir Nedić, Svetozar Marković, Bogdan Popović, Pavle Popović, Jovan Skerlić, Slobodan Jovanović and Branko Lazarević all took a particular liking to him.

Petranović died in Venice on 12 September 1874.

Sources
 
 
 Jovan Skerlić, Istorija nove srpske književnosti (Belgrade, 1921), page 133.

References

1809 births
1874 deaths

People from Šibenik
People from the Kingdom of Dalmatia
Austro-Hungarian Serbs
Serbs of Croatia
Members of the Imperial Diet (Austria)
Members of the Croatian Academy of Sciences and Arts
Serbian writers
19th-century Serbian people
Academic staff of the University of Belgrade